The Queen's Birthday Honours 1900 were announced on 23 May 1900 in celebration of the birthday of Queen Victoria. The list included appointments to various orders and honours of the United Kingdom and British India.

The list was published in The Times on 23 May 1900 and on 24 May 1900 (Irish honours), and the various honours were gazetted in The London Gazette on 23 May 1900, on 1 June 1900 and on 8 June 1900.

The recipients of honours are displayed or referred to as they were styled before their new honour and arranged by honour and where appropriate by rank (Knight Grand Cross, Knight Commander etc.) then division (Military, Civil).

Peerages

Baron
The Right Honourable Michael Morris, Lord Morris
The Right Honourable Sir Peter O'Brien, Bart.
Sir Richard Webster, Bart., GCMG, QC, MP
Her Majesty has also approved the grant to Lord Strathcona and Mount Royal of a new Patent, with remainder to his daughter.

Privy Council
Lord Justice Gerald FitzGibbon
Sir Frederick Milner, Bart., MP

Privy Council of Ireland
Dermot Bourke, 7th Earl of Mayo

Baronet
Sir George Hayter Chubb
James Timmins Chance, Esq.
Edward Walter Greene, Esq.
Arthur Tredgold Lawson, Esq.
Thomas Wrightson, Esq., MP

Knight Bachelor
Charles Clement Bowring, JP of Park Grange, Derby
Professor Hector Clare Cameron,  MD, University of Glasgow
Henry Homewood Crawford, 
John Glover,  Chairman of Lloyd's Shipping Registry
Thomas Godfrey Carey,  Bailiff of Guernsey
John Groves, 
Professor Richard Claverhouse Jebb, MP
Riley Lord, Mayor of Newcastle-upon-Tyne
Colin George Macrae, late Chairman Edinburgh School Board
James C. O′Dowd,  CB
Alderman William Haswell Stephenson, former Mayor of Newcastle-upon-Tyne
Arthur James Richens Trendell,  CMG
William Ward,  Her Majesty's Consul-General at Hamburg
John Watney,  FSA
James Williamson,  Director of Dockyards to the Admiralty
British Empire
Honourable William Bisset Berry, MD, QC, Speaker of the House of Assembly, Cape of Good Hope
William Wilson Mitchell, CMG, Member of the Legislative Council of Ceylon
David Palmer Ross, MD, CMG, Surgeon-General of British Guiana
Francis Pratt Winter, CMG, Chief Judicial Officer of British New Guinea
Allan Arthur, President of the Bengal Chamber of Commerce, late Sheriff of Calcutta and a Member of the Council of the Viceroy of India
Charles Arnold White,  Chief Justice of Madras
Ireland
Daniel Hegarty, Lord Mayor of Cork
William McLearn, Mayor of Londonderry
Joseph Downes, High Sheriff for the City of Dublin
Alfred Graham Dobbin, High Sheriff for the City of Cork
Thomas Henry Cleeve, High Sheriff for the City of Limerick
Thomas W. Robinson,  Chairman of the Kingstown Urban District Council
John William Moore,  President of the Royal College of Physicians of Ireland
John Malcolm Inglis, President of the Dublin Chamber of Commerce
Thomas Drew, President of the Royal Institute of the Architects of Ireland

Other later 1900 Knights Bachelor
Matthew Ingle Joyce, a justice of the Court of Justice. (December 14)

The Most Honourable Order of the Bath

Knight Grand Cross of the Order of the Bath (GCB)
Military Division
 General Sir Charles Cooper Johnson, Indian Staff Corps.
 Lieutenant-General Sir Baker Creed Russell, Colonel 13th Hussars, Commanding the Troops, Southern District.
 General Sir William Olpherts, Colonel-Commandant Royal (late Bengal) Artillery.

Civil Division
 The Right Honourable the Earl of Jersey,

Knight Commander of the Order of the Bath (KCB)
Military Division
 Colonel Frederick John Keen, Indian Staff Corps.
 General John Louis Nation, Indian Staff Corps.
 General Sir Thomas Edward Gordon, Indian Staff Corps.
 Lieutenant-Colonel and Colonel (Honorary Major-General) John Hills, Royal (late Bombay) Engineers.
 Major-General Hugh McCalmont, Commanding Cork District.
 Lieutenant-General Edward Hopton, Colonel Connaught Rangers, Lieutenant-Governor and General Officer Commanding the Troops, Jersey.
 Lieutenant-General George Digby Barker, Governor and Commander-in-Chief, Bermuda.
 Lieutenant-General Henry Le Guay Geary, Royal Artillery, President Ordnance Committee.
 Major-General Thomas Fraser, Royal Engineers, Commanding Thames District.
 Major-General John Frederick Maurice, Royal Artillery, Commanding Woolwich District.
 General Alexander George Montgomery Moore, Colonel 18th Hussars, Commanding Aldershot

Civil Division
 John Samuel Purcell, Esq., late Controller of Stamps and Stores, and Registrar of Joint Stock Companies, Inland Revenue Department
 David Gill, Esq., Her Majesty's Astronomer, Cape of Good Hope
 William Conyngham Greene, Esq., of Her Majesty's Diplomatic Service, late British Agent at Pretoria
 Henry Augustus Robinson, Esq., Vice-President Local Government Board, Ireland

Companion of the Order of the Bath (CB)
Military Division
 Surgeon - General Henry Skey Muir, Deputy Director-General, Army Medical Service.
 Major-General Edmund Smith Brook.
 Lieutenant-Colonel and Colonel Vincent Rivaz, Indian Staff Corps.
 Colonel Andrew McCrae Bruce, Bengal Infantry.
 Lieutenant-Colonel and Brevet Colonel Celadon Charles Brownlow, Indian Staff Corps.
 Lieutenant-Colonel and Brevet Colonel Edward Molloy, Indian Staff Corps.
 Lieutenant-Colonel and Brevet Colonel Robert Alexander Swetenham, Indian Staff Corps.
 Colonel George Hand More-Molyneux, Indian Staff Corps, Colonel on the Staff, India.
 Colonel William John Vousden, Indian Staff Corps, Colonel on the Staff, India.
 Colonel (temporary Brigadier-General) Henry Pipon, Colonel on the Staff for Royal Artillery, India.
 Colonel (temporary Major-General) Frederick Wilson Hemming, Commanding Cavalry Brigade, Aldershot (temporarily).
 Colonel Hugh Gough Grant, Regimental District.
 Colonel Richard Charles Hare, Regimental District.
 Colonel Charles Hervey Bagot, Royal Engineers, Deputy Inspector-General of Fortifications, Headquarters of Army.
 Colonel Arthur Robert Ford Dorward, Colonel on the Staff for Royal Engineers, Wei-hai-Wei.
 Colonel Edward Roberts, Army Pay Department.
 Lieutenant-Colonel George Vaughan Hamilton, late Army Service Corps.
 Veterinary-Lieutenant-Colonel (temporary Veterinary-Colonel) Henry Thomson, Army Veterinary Department.
 Lieutenant-Colonel Benjamin Bloomfield Connolly, Surgeon-Lieutenant-Colonel, late Army Medical Staff.
 Major and Brevet Lieutenant-Colonel Edmund Spencer Eardley Childers, Royal Engineers.

Civil Division
 Alfred Bonham Carter, late Referee of Private Bills, House of Commons
 William Donaldson, late of the Scottish Prison Commission
 James Brown Dougherty, Assistant Under-secretary, Dublin Castle
 James Gairdner, late of the Public Record Office
 Edward Stafford Howard, Senior Commissioner of Her Majesty's Woods and Forests
 Colonel Herbert William Jackson, employed with the Egyptian Army
 John Arrow Kempe, Deputy-Chairman Customs Establishment
 Charles Dowson Lang, Controller Savings Bank Department, General Post Office
 Alexander Carnegie Ross, British Consul at Lorenzo Marques
 Major John Trenchard Tennant, Assistant Secretary, Board of Agriculture
 Charles Inigo Thomas, Principal Clerk, Admiralty
 Thomas Edward Thorpe, Principal of the Government Laboratory, Somerset House

Order of the Star of India

Knight Commander of the Order of the Star of India (KCSI)
His Highness Maharao Umed Singh Bahadur, of Kotah.

Companion of the Order of the Star of India (CSI)
Henry Martin Winterbotham, Esq., Indian Civil Service.
Arthur Henry Temple Martindale, Esq., Indian Civil Service.
Frederick Robert Upcott, Esq., Secretary .to the Government of India in the Public Works Department.
Herbert Charles Fanshawe, Esq., Indian Civil Service.
Edward Norman Baker, Esq., Indian Civil Service.

Order of St Michael and St George

Knights Grand Cross of the Order of St Michael and St George (GCMG)
Sir Henry Mortimer Durand, Her Majesty's Envoy Extraordinary and Minister Plenipotentiary to His Majesty the Emperor of China, for his services in China.
Sir Claude Maxwell MacDonald, Her Majesty's Envoy Extraordinary and Minister Plenipotentiary to His Majesty the Shah of Persia, for his services in Persia.

Knights Commander of the Order of St Michael and St George (KCMG)
Alfred Edmund Bateman, Esq., CMG, Comptroller-General of the Commercial, Labour and Stratistical Department of the Board of Trade, for services in connection with commercial negotiations with foreign countries.
Ewen Cameron, Esq., Managing Director of the Hong Kong and Shanghai Banking Corporation, for services to Her Majesty's Government with regards to affairs in China

Companions of the Order of St Michael and St George (CMG)
Joseph Flint, Esq., Agent-General for Nigeria
Harry English Fulford, Esq., Her Majesty's Consul at Newchwang
Alfred St. John, Esq., Esq., Her Majesty's Consul-General at Callao
Hamilton Hunter, Esq., Acting British Counsul at Samoa
Claude William Kinder, Esq., MICE, for services in connection with Railways in North China
Charles Coles, Esq. (Coles Pasha), Director-General of the Egyptian Prisons Department

Order of the Indian Empire

Knights Grand Commander of the Order of the Indian Empire (GCIE)
His Highness Saramad-i-Rajaha-i-Hindustan, Raj Rajindra Sri Maharajadhiraj Sawai Sir Madho Singh Bahadur, of Jaipur, G.C.S.I. 
His Highness Saramad-i-Rajaha-i-Bundelkhand Maharaja Mabindra Sawai Sir Pratap Singh Bahadur, of Orchha, K.C.I.E.

Knight Commander of the Order of the Indian Empire (KCIE)
Sahibzada Muhammad Obeidullah Khan, C.S.I, Minister of Tonk in Rajputana.

Companions of the Order of the Indian Empire (CIE)

Diwan Bahadur Pakam Rajaratna Mudaliyar, Inspector-General of Registration, Madras.
Walter Charleton Hughes, Esq., Chairman of the City of Bombay Improvement Trust.
Colonel Sydney Long Jacob, R.E., Chief Engineer and Secretary to the Government of the Punjab in the Public Works Department.
Lieutenant-Colonel Aylmer Martin Crofts, Indian Medical Service.
Edmund Penny, Esq., Superintending Engineer and late Secretary .to the Chief. Commissioner of. the Central Provinces, in the Public Works Department.
Henry Marsh, Esq., Superintending Engineer, Irrigation Department, North-Western Provinces.
Captain Bertrand Evelyn Mellish Gurdon, D.S.O., Assistant Political Agent at Chitral.
George Macartney, Esq., Assistant to the Resident in Kashmir for Chinese Affairs.
Rai Bahadur Kailash Chandra Bose.
Henry Felix Hertz, Esq., Assistant Superintendent of Police, Burma.

Honorary Companion of the Order of the Indian Empire (CIE)
General Houtum Schindler.

Kaisar-i-Hind Medal
Abdul Husain Adamji Pirbhai, Esq., Justice of the Peace, Councillor of the Bombay Municipal Corporation, and late Sheriff of Bombay.
His Highness the Maharaja of Bikaner.
Captain Alfred Horsford Bingley, Indian Staff Corps.
Oswald Vivian Bosanquet, Esq., Indian CivilService, Political Agent in Bhopawar, Central India.
Major-General Charles John Burnett,C.B., British Service, Commanding the Poona District.
Denis Calnan, Esq., Indian Civil Service, Magistrate and Collector, North-West Provinces and Oudh.
Lieutenant-Colonel Robert Neil Campbell, M.B., Indian Medical Service, Civil Surgeon of Shillong. 
Alfred Chatterton, Esq., Indian Educational Service, Professor in the College of Engineering, Madras.
Major-General Thomas Arthur Cooke, President of the Plague Committee, Karachi, 1897.
The Maharaja Rameshwara Singh Bahadur, of Darbhanga in Bengal, Additional Member of the Council of the Governor-General for making laws and regulations.
Major-General Sir William Forbes Gatacre, K.C.B., D.S.O., Chairman of the. Plague Committee of Bombay City, 1896, 1897.
His Highness the Maharaja of Gwalior, G.C.S.I. 
Walter Home, Esq., M.I.C.E., Superintending Engineer, Joihpur, Rajputana.
Robert Humphreys, Esq., B.A., Indian Civil Service, Deputy Commissioner of Hissar, Punjab.
The Maharani of Hatwa in the Saran District, Bengal.
Captain Charles Henry James, Indian Medical Service, Plague Medical Officer in the Jullundur and Hoshiarpur District.
Khaehar Ala Chela, C.S.I., Chief of Jasdan in the Bombay Presidency.
Richard Amphlett Lamb, Esq., Indian Civil Service, Magistrate and Collector, Ahmednagar. 
Sir Francis William Maclean, K.C.I.E., Q.C., Chief Justice of the High Court of Judicature, Fort William, Bengal, and Chairman of the General Committee of the Indian Famine Charitable Relief Fund.
Francis St. George Manners Smith, Esq., Executive Engineer of Ajmere, Rajputana. 
Vishwanath Patankar Madhava Rao, Esq., C.I.E., Member of the State Council of Mysore. 
Behramji Mehrvanji Malabari, Esq., Justice of the Peace, Proprietor and Editor of the Indian Spectator, Bombay.
Muhammad Yusuf Ismail, of Rangoon.
Rai Bahadur Nanak Chand, Minister to His Highness the Maharaja Holkar of Indore. 
Colonel Duncan George Pitcher, Indian Staff Corps, Director of Land Records, Gwalior State.
Henry Sharp, Esq., M.A., Indian Educational Service, Inspector of Schools, Central Provinces, and Famine Relief Officer, Bstul District. 
William Didsbury Sheppard, Esq., Indian Civil Service, Magistrate and Collector, Poona. 
Donald Mackenzie Smeaton, Esq., M.A., C.S.L, Indian Civil Service, Honorary Secretary of the General Committee of the Indian Famine Charitable Relief Fund.
Smarta Sri Ram, Rai.Bahadur, M.A., LL.B., Honorary Magistrate and Vice-Chairman of Lucknow Municipality, Member of Legislative Council, North-West Provinces and Oudh.
Rai Bahadur Trimbak Rao Nilkant Deshmukh, Extra Assistant Commissioner and Superintendent of the Raj Nandgaon State, Central Provinces.
Raja Venugopala Bahadur of Venkatagiri, Madras Presidency.
Nawab Sir Vikar-ul-Umra, Bahadur, K.C.I.E., Minister to His Highness the Nizam of Hyderabad.
Edgar Francis Latimer Winter, Esq., Indian Civil Service, Magistrate aud Collector in the North-West Provinces and Oudh.

References

Birthday Honours
1900 awards
1900 in the United Kingdom